Jean Alberto McLean Marenco (born 16 January 1984) is a Panamanian professional football midfielder playing in Panamá for Panamanian Second Division team SUNTRACS.

Club career
He won the 2005 ANAPROF league title with Plaza Amador in November 2005. In 2007, he moved to Tauro.

In January 2010 McLean joined Colombian giants América Cali on a one year-loan alongside compatriot Edwin Aguilar. He however already returned in April 2010 after the club failed to pay his wages.

International career
McLean played at the 2003 FIFA World Youth Championship in the United Arab Emirates.

He made his senior debut for Panama in an August 2007 friendly match against Guatemala and has earned a total of 4 caps, scoring no goals.

His final international was an October 2010 friendly match against Cuba.

Honours 
Liga Panameña de Fútbol (1): 2007 (A)

References

External links

1984 births
Living people
Sportspeople from Panama City
Association football midfielders
Panamanian footballers
Panama international footballers
C.D. Plaza Amador players
Tauro F.C. players
América de Cali footballers
Categoría Primera A players
Panamanian expatriate footballers
Expatriate footballers in Colombia
Panamanian expatriate sportspeople in Colombia
Veraguas Club Deportivo players